Chesapeake Energy Corporation is an American exploration and production company, headquartered in Oklahoma City.

As of December 31, 2021, the company had  of estimated proved reserves, of which 69% was natural gas, 23% was petroleum, and 8% was natural gas liquids.

History
The company was founded in 1989 by Aubrey McClendon and Tom L. Ward with an initial investment of $50,000. McClendon named the company after Chesapeake Bay due to his love of the region. Ward left the company in 2006 to establish SandRidge Energy.

In 1993, the company became a public company via an initial public offering, with a valuation of $25 million.

Focusing on a strategy of drilling horizontal natural gas wells in unconventional reservoirs, the company built a sizable position in the Golden Trend and Sholem Alechem fields of South-central Oklahoma and in the Giddings field of Southeast Texas.

In the mid-1990s, the company unsuccessfully attempted to extend the Austin Chalk play into western and central Louisiana.

In 1997, the company wrote down the value of its assets by over $200 million, approximately equal to shareholder's equity at the time, due to low commodity prices and implemented a turnaround plan.

In the early 2000s, after a rise in natural gas prices made it economically feasible, the company focused on unconventional drilling in carbonates, tight sandstone, and shale particularly in the Barnett Shale, Fayetteville Shale, and the Marcellus Formation.

In 2006, the company was added to the S&P 500. It was removed from the index in 2018.

In 2008, the company announced its discovery of the Haynesville Shale in East Texas and northwestern Louisiana.

In 2009, the company partnered with Orange County Choppers to create the first chopper powered by compressed natural gas.

In 2011, Chesapeake Energy agreed to a 12-year naming rights partnership with the Oklahoma City Thunder for naming and branding rights of the Paycom Center at a cost of $3 million per year, with annual increases of 3%. On April 20, 2021, the agreement was terminated.

In June 2012, in response to shareholder concerns about corporate governance issues under McClendon's watch, the company appointed Archie W. Dunham as chairman, while Aubrey McClendon remained CEO.

In December 2012, the company sold midstream assets for $2.16 billion.

Effective April 1, 2013, Aubrey McClendon was forced to leave the company after revelations that he took a personal stake in Chesapeake wells and then used those investments as collateral for up to $1.1 billion in loans from banks that also financed the company.

In May 2013, Robert Douglas Lawler, an executive of Anadarko Petroleum, was named CEO of the company.

In 2013, Chesapeake sold 55,000 net acres in the Northern Eagle Ford Shale and 9,600 net acres in the Haynesville Shale to EXCO for aggregate proceeds of $1 billion.

In December 2014, Chesapeake sold a large portion of its oil and gas assets in the Marcellus Formation and Utica Shale to Southwestern Energy for net proceeds of $4.975 billion. The transaction included approximately 413,000 net acres and 1,500 wells in northern West Virginia and southern Pennsylvania. Net production of the sold assets was 57,000 barrels of oil equivalent per day in December 2014.

In 2014, the company also sold additional midstream assets for $520 million.

In September 2015, the company announced layoffs of hundreds of people in Oklahoma City.

On March 2, 2016, former CEO and co-founder Aubrey McClendon died in a single-occupant single-vehicle crash when he drove his vehicle directly into a concrete bridge embankment in Oklahoma City. It occurred the day after a United States Department of Justice federal grand jury indicted McClendon for violating antitrust laws during his leadership at Chesapeake.

In 2017, the company sold assets in the Haynesville shale for $465 million.

In January 2018, the company laid off 400 employees.

In the first quarter of 2018, the company sold assets in Oklahoma for $500 million.

In February 2019, the company acquired Texas oil producer WildHorse Resource Development for $4 billion in cash and stock.

In June 2020, the company filed for bankruptcy protection with $7 billion in debt. It emerged from bankruptcy protection in February 2021.

In April 2021, Doug Lawler resigned as CEO of the company and  Mike Wichterich, Chair of the Board of Directors, was named interim-CEO.

In November 2021, the company acquired Vine Energy, which operated in the Haynesville Shale.

In March 2022, the company acquired Chief Oil & Gas.

In February 2023, it was announced the company had sold a portion of its oil and gas assets in the Eagle Ford shale, south Texas for US$1.4 billion, to the UK-headquartered multinational company, Ineos.

Antitrust allegations

Alleged collusion with Encana
In mid-2012, the U.S. Department of Justice (DOJ) began an investigation into whether Encana, Canada's largest natural gas company, "illegally colluded with Chesapeake Energy Corp to lower the price of Michigan exploration lands during a public land auction in May 2010." Encana's internal investigation determined in 2012 that it did not collude with Chesapeake. The investigation ended in 2014.

Cancellation of leases
On June 5, 2014, the state of Michigan filed felony fraud and racketeering charges against Chesapeake Energy, alleging that the company canceled hundreds of land leases on false pretenses after it sought to obtain oil and gas rights. Michigan attorney general Bill Schuette claimed that the company "obtained uncompensated land options from these landowners by false pretenses, and prevented competitors from leasing the land." Chesapeake Energy disputed all charges. In 2015, the company settled the lawsuits by agreeing to pay $25 million to the landowners.

Underpayment of royalties to landowners
The company has faced thousands of lawsuits regarding the alleged under-payment of royalties due to individuals that rented land to the company. In 2013, the company agreed to pay $7.5 million to settle a class action lawsuit by Pennsylvania landowners. In 2017, the company agreed to pay another $30 million to Pennsylvania landowners.

Alleged collusion in Oklahoma
On March 1, 2016, a DOJ federal grand jury indicted Aubrey McClendon for allegedly rigging the bidding process for land leases between December 2007 and March 2012. McClendon was charged of orchestrating a conspiracy in which two oil and gas companies, not named in the indictment, colluded not to bid against each other for the purchase of land in northwestern Oklahoma. According to the indictment, the companies decided ahead of time who would win bids, with the winner then allocating an interest in the leases to the other company, eliminating open competitive bidding. The DOJ said this was the first case resulting from a continuing federal antitrust investigation into price fixing, bid rigging, and other anti-competitive conduct in the petroleum industry.

The next day, on March 2, 2016, McClendon died in a single-occupant single-vehicle crash when he drove his vehicle straight into a concrete bridge embankment. The charges were dropped by the DOJ as a result of the death.

Possible conflicts of interest by Ex-CEO Aubrey McClendon
Ex-CEO Aubrey McClendon was accused of engaging in several conflicts of interest that benefited him at the expense of shareholders of the company:
 McClendon nominated several of his friends, including long time childhood friends, to the board of the company and made them the highest-paid directors in the petroleum industry. In return, the board made McClendon the highest paid CEO of any company in the S&P 500, awarding him a salary of $112 million.
 McClendon had the company develop a shopping center near the company's headquarters and lease space to restaurants part-owned by McClendon. The company used these restaurants for millions of dollars worth of catering business.
 McClendon and his family frequently used business jets owned by the company for personal reasons. McClendon has stated that this was allowed per his employment agreement.
 When McClendon needed money, he convinced the board to have the company purchase his collection of rare maps hanging in the company's offices for $12 million.
 An entire department at the company, known as "AKM Operations" was dedicated to working on personal projects of McClendon, including having his house fixed after a hail storm.
 The company signed an agreement to pay $3 million per year for the naming and branding rights to the Paycom Center, where the Oklahoma City Thunder play. The company also committed to buy $3 million worth of tickets per year. McClendon owned a 19% interest in the team.
 Since McClendon was a history major and loved history, he hired a company historian, who was paid a salary of over $100,000 per year. He also hired the World's Strongest Man, who also received a salary of over $100,000 per year, to promote exercise among company staff.
 Through the Founders Well Participation Program, McClendon was able to purchase a 2.5% interest in every well the company drills. McClendon borrowed as much as $1.1 billion against his 2.5% stake in thousands of company wells from banks that were also lenders to the company. After this potential conflict was made public, the company terminated the Founders Well Participation Program. The U.S. Securities and Exchange Commission opened an informal inquiry of McClendon's borrowing practices. However, no enforcement action was taken.

Lobbying
In 2004, then CEO Aubrey McClendon contributed $450,000 to the campaign of Tom Corbett for attorney general of Pennsylvania. These funds were cited as the reason Corbett won the election, with a narrow margin. When Corbett eventually became governor of Pennsylvania, he was very supportive of Chesapeake's fracking activity in Pennsylvania, and Pennsylvania was the only state without a severance tax on drillers, despite the fact that the budget for education was being reduced.

In 2008, then CEO Aubrey McClendon formed American Clean Skies Foundation, a non-profit foundation focused on selling the virtues of natural gas. The foundation was funded by the company and by McClendon. The foundation was criticized for doing nothing but pushing Congress to pass policies that benefited the company and McClendon's business interests.

Environmental damage

Discharges of fill material
In 2013, the Environmental Protection Agency levied a fine of $3.2 million on a subsidiary of the company and forced it to spend $6.5 million "to restore 27 sites damaged by unauthorized discharges of fill material into streams and wetlands".

2011 well blowout
On April 19, 2011, due to a failed seal assembly in a wellhead, the company lost control of a natural gas well in Bradford County, Pennsylvania that was being fracture stimulated, causing a large spill of salt water and chemicals, such as 2-butoxyethanol and methanol, into the surrounding countryside. By April 22, 2011, the leak had been stemmed. Maryland announced its intention to sue the company for violation of the Resource Conservation and Recovery Act and the Clean Water Act since fracking fluids from the well blowout wound up in the Chesapeake Bay.

2015 landslide
In November 2015, the company was fined $1.4 million in Pennsylvania for a landslide caused by the company in 2011 that resulted in clogged waterways.

Earthquakes Oklahoma and Kansas correlated with hydraulic fracturing
In 2007, Oklahoma recorded a single earthquake. By 2015, after the rise in hydraulic fracturing, there were more than 900. After the 2011 Oklahoma earthquake in Prague, Oklahoma, having suffered home damage and physical injury, a resident sued Chesapeake. The Sierra Club also filed a lawsuit against Chesapeake and Devon Energy over damages suffered in a magnitude 5.8, 2016 Oklahoma earthquake near Pawnee, which was tied for the largest such shock in the eastern United States in 70 years. A judge dismissed the lawsuit in April 2017.

Awards and recognition
In 2007, the company was named the best managed oil-and-gas company by Forbes.

In 2009, S&P Global Platts named the company as the Energy Producer of the Year and it received the Industry Leadership Award. The company was also a finalist in the Deal of the Year, CEO of the Year, and Community Development Program of the Year categories. In 2012, the company received an Award of Excellence.

In 2010, Shaleplay, the company's corporate band, won first place in the Fortune Battle of the Corporate Bands.

In 2014, the company was ranked 51st on the 100 Best Companies to Work by Fortune.

In 2021, the company achieved Grad "A" MiQ and EO100 Certification for its legacy Haynesville Shale operations.

References

External links

1989 establishments in Oklahoma
American companies established in 1989
Companies based in Oklahoma City
Companies formerly listed on the New York Stock Exchange
Companies listed on the Nasdaq
Companies that filed for Chapter 11 bankruptcy in 2020
Energy companies established in 1989
Natural gas companies of the United States
Non-renewable resource companies established in 1989
Oil companies of the United States
Petroleum in Oklahoma